Haupai Puha (born 12 February 1985) is a New Zealand professional darts player who plays in Professional Darts Corporation (PDC) events.

Darts career
Puha qualified for 2 2018 World Series of Darts events in Australia and New Zealand as the number 2 ranked player in the DPNZ rankings. He would lose in the first round of both events to Kyle Anderson in Auckland and to Rob Cross in Melbourne. He made his first PDC major appearance at the 2019 World Cup of Darts in Hamburg together with Cody Harris. They beat Lithuania and South Africa to reach the quarter-finals, eventually losing to Japan.

Puha also qualified for all three World Series events in Australia and New Zealand in 2019. He lost to Raymond van Barneveld in the first round of both the 2019 Brisbane Darts Masters and the 2019 Melbourne Darts Masters, and to Gary Anderson in the first round of the 2019 New Zealand Darts Masters.

Puha has qualified for both the PDC & WDF World Championships in recent years, Losing in his 1st match in both. 

Puha credits his experience with golf in making the transition to darts.

World Championship results

PDC
 2021: First round (lost to Mickey Mansell 0–3)

WDF
 2022: First round (lost to Ben Hazel 1–2)
 2023:

References

External links

1985 births
Living people
New Zealand darts players
Professional Darts Corporation associate players
People from Christchurch
PDC World Cup of Darts team New Zealand